It Ain't Easy may refer to:

It Ain't Easy (Three Dog Night album) (1970)
It Ain't Easy (Long John Baldry album) (1971)
It Ain't Easy, a 1972 American film
It Ain't Easy (Janie Fricke album) (1982)
It Ain't Easy (Chris Smither album) (1984)
"It Ain't Easy" (Ron Davies song), a song by Ron Davies, recorded by David Bowie
"It Ain't Easy" (Sugababes song), a song by Sugababes
"It Ain't Easy", a song by Ratt from their self-titled album
"It Ain't Easy", a song by Robert Forster from the album The Evangelist
"It Ain't Easy", a song by Tupac Shakur from the album Me Against the World
"It Ain't Easy (On Your Own)", a 2004 song by Ricky Fanté